L'Opéra du pauvre (English: Poor's Opera) is a piece for voices and orchestra formalized by Léo Ferré as a quadruple concept album released in 1983. This dreamlike and wry plea in favor of the Night, symbol of imagination and subversiveness for Ferré, synthesizes all aspects of the French poet and musician.

History 
L'Opéra du pauvre comes from a "lyrical" ballet titled The Night, written in 1956 at the request of choreographer and dancer Roland Petit, within the Revue des Ballets de Paris. The piece was  abandoned by Petit after a few performances (critics being severely negative). Ferré published the libretto same year at La Table Ronde Editions. This work stayed then on the shelf for twenty-six years.

It was after the triple LP Ludwig - L'Imaginaire - Le Bateau ivre was released in 1982, that Léo Ferré decided to dedicate his upcoming year to bring The Night back to life. As time had passed, Ferré had accumulated a lot of material, and he chose to enrich his original text and score with elements from various sources, thus creating a new Baroque work of much larger scope (it would take four LP to hold this whole new version).

Roles 
Léo Ferré changes his voice and acts all parts.

 Narrator
 The Night, defendant
 The Raven, presiding judge
 The Cock, prosecutor
 The Owl, Night's attorney
 The Cat, court clerk
 The Nun, witness
 The Rose, witness
 Calva, night-club landlord and witness
 Miseria, witness
 The Glow-worm, witness
 The two Prostitutes, witnesses
 The Child, witness
 The Casino Player, witness
 The Candle, witness
 Death, witness
 The Blue Whale, witness
 The Poet, witness
 Hearing audience
 Saint Peter's voice & various voices

Synopsis 
The Night is accused of having murdered Lady Shadow, who is missing. The opera depicts Night's trial by the "day people", allegorized by animals. The judge is a raven, prosecutor is a cock and Night's attorney is an owl. Witnesses, all night owls for some reason of their own, are called to the bar and try to save the Night.

Personnel 
 Léo Ferré - voices, piano
 Giuseppe Magnani - violin solo
 Milan Symphonic Orchestra

Production 
 Arranger and orchestra conductor: Léo Ferré
 Engineer: Paolo Bocchi
 Producer: Léo Ferré

References

Léo Ferré albums
French-language albums
1983 albums